Shibuki may refer to:

 Ayano Shibuki, Japanese volleyball player
 Jun Shibuki, Japanese actress
 Shibuki Station, a train station in Yamaguchi Prefecture, Japan